Raymond Robinson was an American baseball pitcher in the Negro leagues and minor leagues. He played with the Newark Eagles in 1938, the Cincinnati Buckeyes in 1942, and the Baltimore Elite Giants in 1947.

References

External links
 and Seamheads

Year of birth missing
Year of death missing
Newark Eagles players
Baltimore Elite Giants players
Cincinnati Buckeyes players
Baseball pitchers